Korošče is a small settlement in the hills west of Sveti Vid in the Municipality of Cerknica in the Inner Carniola region of Slovenia.

References

External links 

Korošče on Geopedia

Populated places in the Municipality of Cerknica